Adam Bark  (born 15 February 2000) is a Swedish footballer who plays for Motala AIF in the Swedish Division 1 Södra.

Club career

Örebro SK
Adam Bark started his career in Rynninge IK. During his youth, he represented several clubs in Örebro. 15-year old Bark joined Örebro SK in November 2016, after a good season with IK Sturehov, where he played for the club's best team in the Swedish fourth division. Bark started on the club's U17 team. In January 2017, Bark played his first game for Örebro's first team, when he scored a goal in a friendly game against IK Sirius.

After having been with the first team squad on three training camps, played several friendly and U21 games, trained regularly with the first team and been on the bench for two Allsvenskan games, the club confirmed on 8 December 2018, that Bark and Helmer Andersson had been promoted to the first team squad for the 2019 season. However, he was still under a youth-contract, which expired at the end of the new season. 

On 14 July 2019, he got his Allsvenskan and professional debut in a game against BK Häcken. Bark started on the bench, but replaces Albin Granlund in the 88th minute. However, he left the club at the end of 2019, where his contract expired, as he was not offered his first professional contract.

Motala AIF
Shortly after the contract with ÖSK expired, Bark signed a two-year contract with newly promoted Division 1 Södra team Motala AIF.

References

External links

Adam Bark at Motala AIF's website
Adam Bark at LagStatistik
Adam Bark at SvFF

2000 births
Living people
Swedish footballers
Sweden youth international footballers
Rynninge IK players
Karlslunds IF players
IK Sturehov players
Örebro SK players
Motala AIF players
Allsvenskan players
Ettan Fotboll players
Association football forwards